The 1984–85 QMJHL season was the 16th season in the history of the Quebec Major Junior Hockey League. The league experimented for season, awarding one point for an overtime loss. Points for an overtime loss would not be awarded again until the 1999–2000 QMJHL season.

The Plattsburgh Pioneers were admitted to the league as an expansion team, and the first QMJHL franchise based in the United States. It was the second league expansion in three seasons, having added two franchise in the 1982–83 QMJHL season, bringing the league up to twelve teams. The league did not have an expansion draft. The Pioneers featured an all-American lineup of players, who were not playing in the NCAA. The team folded after losing its first 17 games in 1984. Games played against the Pioneers and the points earned, were not included in the final standings. The remaining eleven teams played 68 games each which counted in the regular season standings.

The Shawinigan Cataractes finished first overall in the regular season, winning the Jean Rougeau Trophy. The Verdun Junior Canadiens won the President's Cup, defeating the Chicoutimi Saguenéens in the finals. Coach Jean Bégin had been fired by the Laval Voisins after 19 games, then is hired by the Verdun Junior Canadiens with five games remaining in the season, leading the team to a league championship.

Team changes
 The Verdun Juniors are renamed the Verdun Junior Canadiens.
 The Plattsburgh Pioneers join the league as an expansion franchise, playing in the Lebel Division.
 The Granby Bisons switch to the Dilio Division.

Final standings
Note: GP = Games played; W = Wins; L = Losses; T = Ties; OL = Overtime loss; PTS = Points; GF = Goals for; GA = Goals against

‡Games played against the Plattsburgh Pioneers and the points earned, were not included in the final standings.
complete list of standings.

Scoring leaders
Note: GP = Games played; G = Goals; A = Assists; Pts = Points; PIM = Penalties in Minutes

 complete scoring statistics

Playoffs
Claude Lemieux was the leading scorer of the playoffs with 40 points (23 goals, 17 assists).

Quarterfinals
 Shawinigan Cataractes defeated Quebec Remparts 4 games to 0.
 Chicoutimi Saguenéens defeated Saint-Jean Castors 4 games to 1.
 Drummondville Voltigeurs defeated Trois-Rivières Draveurs 4 games to 3.
 Verdun Junior Canadiens defeated Hull Olympiques 4 games to 1.

Semifinals
 Verdun Junior Canadiens defeated Shawinigan Cataractes 4 games to 1.
 Chicoutimi Saguenéens defeated Drummondville Voltigeurs 4 games to 1.

Finals
 Verdun Junior Canadiens defeated Chicoutimi Saguenéens 4 games to 0.

All-star teams
First team
 Goaltender - Daniel Berthiaume, Chicoutimi Saguenéens
 Left defence - Steve Duchesne, Drummondville Voltigeurs 
 Right defence - Yves Beaudoin, Shawinigan Cataractes 
 Left winger - Sergio Momesso, Shawinigan Cataractes
 Centreman - Guy Rouleau, Longueuil Chevaliers 
 Right winger - Claude Lemieux, Verdun Junior Canadiens  
 Coach - Ron Lapointe, Shawinigan Cataractes
Second team
 Goaltender - Alain Raymond, Trois-Rivières Draveurs  
 Left defence - Steven Finn, Laval Voisins 
 Right defence - James Gasseau, Drummondville Voltigeurs 
 Left winger - Luc Robitaille, Hull Olympiques
 Centreman - Stephane Richer, Chicoutimi Saguenéens
 Right winger - Marc Damphousse, Shawinigan Cataractes
 Coach - Mario Bazinet, Chicoutimi Saguenéens
 List of First/Second/Rookie team all-stars.

Trophies and awards
Team
President's Cup - Playoff Champions, Verdun Junior Canadiens
Jean Rougeau Trophy - Regular Season Champions, Shawinigan Cataractes
Robert Lebel Trophy - Team with best GAA, Shawinigan Cataractes

Player
Michel Brière Memorial Trophy - Most Valuable Player, Daniel Berthiaume, Chicoutimi Saguenéens
Jean Béliveau Trophy - Top Scorer, Guy Rouleau, Longueuil Chevaliers
Guy Lafleur Trophy - Playoff MVP, Claude Lemieux, Verdun Junior Canadiens
Jacques Plante Memorial Trophy - Best GAA, Daniel Berthiaume, Chicoutimi Saguenéens
Emile Bouchard Trophy - Defenceman of the Year, Yves Beaudoin, Shawinigan Cataractes
Mike Bossy Trophy - Best Pro Prospect, Jose Charbonneau, Drummondville Voltigeurs
Michel Bergeron Trophy - Offensive Rookie of the Year, Jimmy Carson, Verdun Junior Canadiens
Raymond Lagacé Trophy - Defensive Rookie of the Year, Robert Desjardins, Shawinigan Cataractes
Frank J. Selke Memorial Trophy - Most sportsmanlike player, Patrick Emond, Chicoutimi Sagueneens
Marcel Robert Trophy - Best Scholastic Player, Claude Gosselin, Quebec Remparts

See also
1985 Memorial Cup
1985 NHL Entry Draft
1984–85 OHL season
1984–85 WHL season

References
 Official QMJHL Website
 www.hockeydb.com/

Quebec Major Junior Hockey League seasons
QMJHL
QMJHL